Onoba elegans is a species of marine gastropod mollusc in the family Rissoidae. First described by Winston Ponder in 1965, it is endemic to the waters of New Zealand.

Description

Onoba elegans has an ovate shell, with a tall spire and five whorls. The species measures 3.1mm by 2.15mm. The animal is yellowish-white in colour, with short cephalic tentacles.

Distribution

The species is endemic to New Zealand. The holotype was collected by K. Hipkins on 29 December 1953, from a depth of 40 metres, 0.8 km west of Stephenson Island in the Whangaroa Harbour, Northland Region. Specimens have been found on the east coast of the Northland Region, and the north-west and north of the Aupouri Peninsula.

References

Rissoidae
Gastropods described in 1965
Gastropods of New Zealand
Endemic fauna of New Zealand
Endemic molluscs of New Zealand
Molluscs of the Pacific Ocean
Taxa named by Winston Ponder